Hubert Brathwaite (born 6 June 1950) is a Barbadian cricketer. He played in six first-class and five List A matches for the Barbados cricket team from 1978 to 1984.

See also
 List of Barbadian representative cricketers

References

External links
 

1950 births
Living people
Barbadian cricketers
Barbados cricketers
People from Saint John, Barbados